Richard Weldon "Doc" Urich (September 20, 1928 – April 28, 1997) was an American football player and coach.  He served as the head football coach at University at Buffalo from 1966 to 1968 and at Northern Illinois University from 1969 to 1970, compiling a career record of 24–26.

Coaching career
For 16 years, starting in 1951, Urich was an assistant coach to Ara Parseghian at Miami University, Northwestern University and the University of Notre Dame.  In 1966, Urich became the head coach at the University of Buffalo.  In 1969, Urich became the head coach and at Northern Illinois University.  Urich was the 12th head football coach for the Huskies and he held that position for two seasons, from 1969 until 1970.  His record at Northern Illinois was 6–14.  Urich spent 15 years as an assistant coach in the National Football League (NFL) with the Buffalo Bills, Denver Broncos, Washington Redskins, and Green Bay Packers.

Death
Urich died in 1997 of a heart attack.

Head coaching record

References

1928 births
1997 deaths
American football ends
Buffalo Bills coaches
Buffalo Bulls football coaches
Denver Broncos coaches
Green Bay Packers coaches
Miami RedHawks football coaches
Miami RedHawks football players
Northern Illinois Huskies football coaches
Northwestern Wildcats football players
Notre Dame Fighting Irish football coaches
Washington Redskins coaches
Sportspeople from Toledo, Ohio